Stephen Sayadian, also known as Rinse Dream, is a multi-talented artist who was active in the 1980s and 1990s.

He was the advertising creative director for Larry Flynt Publications and an acclaimed art director & production designer responsible for some of the most iconic VHS box art covers and movie posters of the 1980s before he wrote, produced, and directed underground films, including Nightdreams (1981), Café Flesh (1982), and Dr. Caligari (1989).

Career
Sayadian began his career as a magazine satirist, having submitted work to Mad Magazine, Marvel Comics, and National Lampoon. In the fall of 1976 Sayadian - just 23 years old - took his portfolio to publisher Larry Flynt, who hired him on the spot as the creative director in charge of humor and advertising for Larry Flynt Publications, where he conceptualized highly controversial and profitable ad campaigns for Hustler magazine.

After relocating to Hustler's new Los Angeles headquarters in 1978, Sayadian shifted his focus away from the magazine but continued to work on a contract basis. He started an art direction company named Wolfe Studio with photographer Francis Delia, designing one-sheet imagery for many classic VHS box art covers and film posters of the 1980s, including Brian De Palma's Dressed to Kill, John Carpenter's The Fog, and Tobe Hooper's The Funhouse.

In 1981, Sayadian and Delia teamed with former Hustler writer Jerry Stahl and began collaborating on avant-garde pornographic films. It was at this time that Sayadian began using the pseudonym Rinse Dream because of the risk involved with using his actual name for creating pornographic films. Nightdreams (1981) was co-written by Sayadian (as Rinse Dream) and Stahl (as Herbert W. Day) with Delia (as F.X. Pope) behind the camera as the cinematographer and director. Nightdreams was produced on a budget of $65,000 and utilized recycled sets from Wolfe Studio's Dressed to Kill and The Funhouse photoshoots to save money.

The trio followed up the horror themed Nightdreams with the post-apocalyptic science-fiction themed Café Flesh in 1982 with Sayadian (Rinse Dream) as the director. The film had a budget of $100,000 and was made in two separate parts, using the non-pornographic elements of the film to attract financiers.

Nightdreams and Café Flesh were financially unsuccessful in the pornographic market, but they broke house records as midnight movies and replaced David Lynch's Eraserhead and John Waters' Pink Flamingos as they toured the country.

The April 1984 edition of Hustler (volume 10, issue 10) featured an expensive and ambitious 21 page spread that Sayadian produced and directed in collaboration with musician Frank Zappa for his triple album Thing-Fish. Larry Flynt was going to pay for the production of a Broadway show based on the spread, however the cost of the Thing-Fish magazine shoot was not matched by an increase in sales, so Flynt backed out.

In 1989 Sayadin co-wrote (with Stahl), art directed, production designed, costume designed, photographed and directed the avant-garde horror erotic film Dr. Caligari, whose title is inspired by the 1920 film The Cabinet of Dr. Caligari. Made on a budget of $175,000 the film went on to become a midnight movie that found a cult following after it was released on home video.

Sayadian continued to write and direct surreal alt porn films as Rinse Dreams, releasing a total of six feature length video releases between 1990 and 1993 before his career came to an abrupt halt in 1995 when he was informed that he had advanced cirrhosis of the liver. Initially told by doctors that he had six months to live, Sayadian was seriously ill for over a decade before receiving a liver transplant in 2008.

Filmography
 Nightdreams (1981) film co-written and produced as Rinse Dream
 Café Flesh (1982) film co-written and directed as Rinse Dream
 Do It Again (1987) music video for Wall of Voodoo as Stephen Sayadian
 Dr. Caligari (1989) film co-written and directed as Stephen Sayadian
 Nightdreams II (1990) film co-written and directed as Rinse Dream
 Party Doll A Go-Go (1991) video written and directed as Rinse Dream
 Party Doll A Go-Go Part 2 (1991) video written and directed as Rinse Dream
 Nightdreams 3 (1991) video written and directed as Rinse Dream
 Untamed Cowgirls of the Wild West Part 1: The Pillowbiters (1993) video written and directed as Rinse Dream
 Untamed Cowgirls of the Wild West Part 2: Jammy Glands from the Rio Grande (1993) video written and directed as Rinse Dream
 The Art of the Sell: Stephen Sayadian (2015) featurette conducted exclusively for The Criterion Collection's Blu-ray release of Dressed to Kill.

Awards
 1984 AVN Award for Best Art Direction - Café Flesh
 1992 XRCO Hall of Fame inductee - Nightdreams
 2007 XRCO Hall of Fame inductee – Film Creator 
 2017 AVN Hall of Fame inductee – Director

Further reading
 "The Surreal Visions of Rinse Dream", Ultra Violent Magazine, Issue #4 (2002)
 "Dr. Caligari" in: Gods In Spandex: A Survivors' Account Of 80s Cinema Obscura. (UK: Succubus Press, 2007)
 Smith, Jacob. "Sound and Performance in Stephen Sayadian's Night Dreams and Café Flesh", The Velvet Light Trap #59 (Spring 2007)

References

External links
 
 Stephen Sayadian at the Adult Film Database
  as a director

Alt porn
American pornographic film directors
American parodists
American satirists
Surrealist filmmakers
American surrealist artists
Living people
1953 births